Bernard Michael Falk  (16 February 1943 – 4 August  1990) was a British television reporter and interviewer perhaps best known for his contributions to the BBC current affairs and magazine programme Nationwide in the 1970s and the BBC Radio 4 travel programme Breakaway in the 1980s.

He was born in Southport, Lancashire the son of Samuel, a wine merchant, and Belinda Mary Falk (née Kennedy), and was educated at Liverpool College. He began his career in print journalism with the Birkenhead News and played Liverpool's Cavern Club in the evenings as a member of a beat group called 'Tony Snow and his Blizzards', later renamed 'The Bohemians'. He then worked on Fleet Street for the Daily Mirror, before his first job as a television reporter on Scottish Television's regional news programme Scotland Today, covering local issues across Central Scotland. He quickly graduated to Scotland Today Report, a weekly current affairs programme - filmed mostly within STV's region - on the issues of the day.

He enjoyed a short spell at BBC Scotland, appearing on Reporting Scotland and then, an often controversial series of late-night entertainment shows called Falk On.... with the last word of the title featured the subject to be discussed. He later moved to London to join BBC current affairs, appearing in programmes including 24 Hours.

In 1971 Falk was imprisoned for four days in Belfast's Crumlin Road jail for contempt of court. He had interviewed a member of the IRA but refused to reveal his source to the police.

He also hosted the early reality television survival show Now Get Out of That, the late-night live chat show/discussion programme Sin on Saturday in August 1982 - which was axed after three shows - and for reporting on British general election night programmes. He also worked on Start The Week on BBC Radio 4 and was the regular presenter of BBC Radio 4's Saturday morning travel programme, Breakaway.

Falk had a history of heart problems and died of a heart attack, aged 47. He was married and divorced twice.

External links

Bernard Falk BBC Archive report from the first annual Mersey Beat convention
Pressing charges
Now Get Out of That - UKGameshows

1943 births
1990 deaths
People from Southport
British reporters and correspondents
BBC newsreaders and journalists
Journalists imprisoned for refusing to reveal sources
People educated at Liverpool College
Daily Mirror people